CSS Alabamas South African Expeditionary Raid commenced shortly after the Confederate States Navy sloop  left Brazil and the south Atlantic Ocean and patrolled southward of the African continent near the Cape of Good Hope. The raid lasted from about the beginning of August 1863 to the end of September 1863.

The primary area of operation during this expeditionary raid was off the southern seaboard of Africa ranging east and west hunting for China clippers having to make the voyage around the Cape of Good Hope near Cape Town.

Raid overview
CSS Alabama worked its way slowly back and forth in the vicinity of Cape Town in one of the least successful of its seven raids, capturing a few U.S. barks. While operating in this area, the United States Navy's  put into Simon's Town in pursuit of Alabama, but had no luck in finding the evasive Confederate raider. Alabama rendezvoused a few times with its allied ship, .

After this patrol station, Alabama sailed eastward into the Indian Ocean to continue its unhindered commercial raiding as far as Indonesia.

Raid bounty

References
 Hearn, Chester G., Gray Raiders of the Sea, Louisiana State Press, 1996. 
 Luraghi, Raimondo, A History of the Confederate Navy, U.S. Naval Institute Press, 1996. 

South African Expeditionary Raid